 was a Japanese photographer known for photographing children and the life of Nagoya and environs.

Usui was born in Nagoya on 12 December 1916; the actor Shigeru Amachi (born Noboru Usui) was a younger brother. He started photography around 1933 — when he bought a Rokuoh-sha Pearlette (a besutan camera, or copy of the Vest Pocket Kodak) — and from 1934 subscribed to Photo Times, whose regular contributor Sakae Tamura inspired and influenced him.

From the 1930s to the 1950s, Usui worked to set up a series of amateur photography groups in Nagoya. One of these was Shūdan 35, whose members in 1952 included the young Shōmei Tōmatsu.

Between 1950 and 1955 Usui won the annual award in Camera three times, his works there being highly praised by Ken Domon, whose realist approach Usui followed enthusiastically. Usui went on to win contests judged by Domon and held by Photo Art in the late 1950s. 

Usui was not content to stick with realism: some of the photographs from his staged series of the 1980s Arsène Lupin appeared in Popular Photography and the self-published book of them is well regarded.

Usui won Aichi-ken Geijutsu Bunka Shōreishō, a cultural award from Aichi Prefecture, in 1994. At around this time, he — like Shōji Ueda and several other photographers of his era — again came to enjoy photography with a besutan camera or lens. He died in December 2010 at the age of 93.

Books by Usui

  no ki no shita (Under the tobira  tree). Nagoya: Kaoru Usui, 1973.  
. Nagoya: Kaidō Shuppan Iinkai, 1984.   Black and white photographs of kaidō (Japan's ancient roads).
 / Arsène Lupin. Nagoya: Kaoru Usui, 1985.
. Nagoya: Usui Kaoru Shashin no Mise, 1987.   Photographs of Shigeru Amachi.
. Nagoya: Usui Kaoru Shashin no Mise, 1988.  
 (My photographic history of Shōwa: From 1935 to 1970). Nagoya: Usui Kaoru Shashin no Mise, 1991.   Black and white photographs of this 35-year period within the Shōwa period.
. Nagoya: Kyōdo Shuppansha, 1993. .  Photographs of and text about children from the late 1940s until the mid sixties; captions and texts in Japanese only.
(Joint work.) . Nagoya: Kyōdo Shuppansha, 1993. .  
 (All is vanity: Works in three parts for the Aichi Prefecture Geijutsu Bunka award). Nagoya: Kaidō Shuppan Iinkai, 1996.   Color photographs, including a set taken with a besutan lens.
. Nagoya: Kyōdo Shuppansha, 1998. . 
With Toshirō Maruo. Amachi Shigeru. Tokyo: Wides, 1999. .  Photographs of Shigeru Amachi.
. Seto, Aichi: Seto City Art Museum, 2000.   Catalogue of an exhibition held at Seto City Art Museum; photographs of Seto from 1955–64, especially landscapes and children.
. Gifu: Gifu Shinbunsha, 2002. . 

Notes

ReferencesNihon shashinka jiten / 328 Outstanding Japanese Photographers. Kyoto: Tankōsha, 2000. .  Despite the English-language alternative title, all in Japanese.Shashinshū o yomu: Besuto 338 kanzen gaido (Reading photobooks: A complete guide to the best 338). Tokyo: Metarōgu, 1997. .  There is a pocket review of Arsène Lupin'' on p.163.

1916 births
2010 deaths
Japanese photographers
People from Nagoya